The 1939 Boston Red Sox season was the 39th season in the franchise's Major League Baseball history. The Red Sox finished second in the American League (AL) with a record of 89 wins and 62 losses, 17 games behind the New York Yankees, who went on to win the 1939 World Series.

Regular season 
In 1939, the Boston Red Sox finished 17 games behind the New York Yankees. Lefty Grove won 15 games for the Red Sox while Jimmie Foxx hit .360, and had 35 home runs and 105 RBI. Ted Williams made his major league debut in 1939, and batted .327 with 31 home runs. He led the American League with 145 RBIs. After the first game he played against Williams, Yankees catcher Bill Dickey said about Williams, "He's just a damned good hitter." On July 18, the Red Sox traded then-minor league shortstop Pee Wee Reese to the Brooklyn Dodgers, in exchange for $35,000 and two players to be named later (pitcher Red Evans and outfielder Art Parks). Reese would go on to play with the Dodgers for 16 seasons, was a 10-time All-Star, and was inducted to the Baseball Hall of Fame in 1984.

Season standings

Record vs. opponents

Opening Day lineup

Roster

Player stats

Batting

Starters by position 
Note: Pos = Position; G = Games played; AB = At bats; H = Hits; Avg. = Batting average; HR = Home runs; RBI = Runs batted in

Other batters 
Note: G = Games played; AB = At bats; H = Hits; Avg. = Batting average; HR = Home runs; RBI = Runs batted in

Pitching

Starting pitchers 
Note: G = Games pitched; IP = Innings pitched; W = Wins; L = Losses; ERA = Earned run average; SO = Strikeouts

Other pitchers 
Note: G = Games pitched; IP = Innings pitched; W = Wins; L = Losses; ERA = Earned run average; SO = Strikeouts

Relief pitchers 
Note: G = Games pitched; W = Wins; L = Losses; SV = Saves; ERA = Earned run average; SO = Strikeouts

Farm system 

LEAGUE CHAMPIONS: Louisville, Scranton, Canton, Elizabethton, Danville-Schoolfield

Source:

Notes

References

External links
1939 Boston Red Sox team page at Baseball Reference
1939 Boston Red Sox season at baseball-almanac.com

Boston Red Sox seasons
Boston Red Sox
Boston Red Sox
1930s in Boston